Ephraim is a surname. Notable people with the surname include:

Alonzo Ephraim (born 1981), American football player
Hogan Ephraim (born 1988), English football player
Molly Ephraim (born 1986), American actress
Moses Ephraim (1620–1688), Dutch banker
Olaf Ephraim (born 1965), Dutch banker and politician
Veitel Heine Ephraim (1703-1775), Prussian jeweller, mintmaster and entrepreneur